Lisa Williams may refer to:

Lisa Williams (psychic) (born 1973), English claimed psychic and healer
Lisa Williams (poet) (born 1966), American poet
Lisa Williams (footballer) (born 1991), Australian rules footballer